Kim Young-gyu (born 5 January 1995), commonly known as Kiu, is a South Korean footballer who plays as a winger for Daejeon Korail FC.

Football career
Kiu was born in Yeongju, and began his footballing career at local club Young In FBC. In 2010, aged 15, he signed for Real Madrid, but never appeared neither for its first team, nor for its youth setup. In January of the following year, he signed for second-tier club UD Almería, after impressing with CF Palencia.

Kiu was promoted to the reserves in the 2013 summer, and made his debut for the Andalusians' first team on 19 August, coming on as a late substitute for Fernando Soriano in a 2–3 La Liga home loss against Villarreal CF. On 30 January 2015, after appearing rarely, he was loaned to Real Avilés also in Segunda División B, until June.

On 26 July 2016, Kiu was loaned to fellow third-tier club UD Melilla, for one year. After that, he joined Mérida AD on a permanent basis.

Following Mérida's relegation, Kiu joined NK Istra 1961 of the Croatian First Football League in August 2018. Having made three substitute appearances of total five minutes duration, he came back to Spain's third tier in January when he was loaned to CD El Ejido, who ended the campaign with descent.

References

External links

1995 births
Living people
People from Yeongju
South Korean footballers
Association football wingers
La Liga players
Segunda División B players
Croatian Football League players
UD Almería players
UD Almería B players
Real Avilés CF footballers
UD Melilla footballers
Mérida AD players
NK Istra 1961 players
K4 League players
Daejeon Korail FC players
South Korea under-20 international footballers
South Korean expatriate footballers
South Korean expatriate sportspeople in Spain
South Korean expatriate sportspeople in Croatia
Expatriate footballers in Spain
Expatriate footballers in Croatia
Sportspeople from North Gyeongsang Province